As of 2011, Gabon contains 152 Cantons, 52 Communes, 29 Arrondissements, and 26 Districts. These are the third-level administrative units of Gabon and between them make up the units of the Departments of Gabon. Arrondissements tend to be units of major cities such as Libreville and communes are generally seated in the main cities and towns and incorporating the surrounding rural area. The cantons of Gabon are largely rural in nature with a small town or large village as the main centre.

Estuaire Province

Commune of Libreville
Premier Arrondissement	 	 	
Deuxième Arrondissement	 	 	 
Troisième Arrondissement 	 	 	
Quatrième Arrondissement	 	 	 	
Cinquième Arrondissement	 	 	 	
Sixième Arrondissement

Komo (Kango)
Commune of Kango	 	 	 	
Canton of Bokoué	 	 	 	
Canton of Engong	 	 	
Canton of Komo

Komo-Mondah (Ntoum)
Commune of Ntoum	 	 	 
Commune of Owendo	 	 	 
Canton of Ikoy-Tsini	 	 	 
Canton of Komo-Ntoum	 	 	 
Canton of Mbéi	 	 	
Canton of Océan-Gongoué

Komo-Océan (Ndzomoé)
Commune of Ndzomoé
Canton of Remboué-Gongoué
Canton of Océan-Gongoué

Noya (Cocobeach)
Commune of Cocobeach	 	 	 	
Canton of Mouni-Noya	 	 	
Canton of Océan-Mondah

Haut-Ogooué Province

Commune of Franceville	
Premier Arrondissement 	 	 	 	
Deuxième Arrondissement 	 	 	 	
Troisième Arrondissement 	 	 	 	
Quatrième Arrondissement

Bayi-Brikolo (Aboumi)
Commune of Aboumi	 	 	 
Canton of Brikolo

Djoue (Onga)
Commune of Onga	 	 	 	
Canton of Gayi	 	 	 	
Canton of Mpani

Djououri-Aguilli (Bongoville)
Commune of Bongoville	 
Canton of Kayié	 	 
Canton of Lékeye

Lékabi-Léwolo (Ngouoni)
Commune of Ngouoni	 	 	 	
Canton of Ekoula	 	 	 	
Canton of Enkoro (Ngatara)	 	 	 
Canton of Ngoua

Lekoni-Lekori (Akieni) 
Commune of Akiéni	
Canton of Lébényi	 	 	 	
Canton of Lessimi	 	 	 	
Canton of Léwoumou	 	 	 
Canton of Limi

Lekoko (Bakoumba) 
Commune of Bakoumba	 	 	 
Canton of Lébombi	 	 	 	
Canton of  Miagassa

Leboumbi-Leyou (Moanda) 
Commune of Moanda	 	 
Canton of Lébombi-Lékédi	 	 	
Canton of Lékédi-Leyou	 	 	 
Commune of Mounana

Mpassa (Franceville) 
Canton of Kassa	 	 	
Canton of Lekabi	 	 	 	
Canton of Ndjoumou

Ogooué-Létili (Boumango)	 	 
Commune of Boumango	 	
Canton of Loula	 	 	 
Canton of Maloundou

Plateaux (Leconi) 
Commune of Léconi	 	 	 	
Canton of Djouélé-Laboumi	 	 	 	
Canton of Djouya	 	 	 
Canton of Louri

Sebe-Brikolo (Okondja) 
Commune of Okandja	 	 	 	
Canton of Louami-Lélama	 	 	 
Canton of Lékori	 	 	 	
Canton of Lekala	 	 	 	
Canton of Mouniandzi	 	 	 
Canton of Sébé-Louri

Moyen-Ogooué Province

Abanga-Bigne (Ndjole) 
Commune of Ndjolé	 
Canton of Bifoun-Wéliga	 	 	 	
Canton of Ebel-Abanga	 	 	 	
Canton of Ebel-Alembé	 	 	 	
Canton of Samkita

Ogooue et des Lacs (Lambaréné) 
Commune of Lambaréné	 	 	 	
Canton of Lacs-du-Nord	 	 	 	
Canton of Lacs-du-Sud	 	 	 	
Canton of Ogooué-Amont	 	 	 	
Canton of Ogooué-Aval	 	 	 	
Canton of Ogooué-Mbiné	 	 	 	
Canton of Ogooué-Ngounié	 	 	 	
Canton of Route de Fougamou

Ngounié Province

Boumi-Louetsi (Mbigou) 
Commune of Mbigou	 	 
Canton of Bagandou-Ngounié	 	 	 
Canton of Basse-Louétsi	 	 	 	
Canton of Doua	 	 	 
Canton of Louétsi-Boumi	 	 	 	
Canton of Ngounié-Louétsi	 	 	 
Canton of Wano-Ivindzi

Dola (Ndende) 
Commune of Ndendé	 	 	 
Canton of Dola-Nord	 	 	 	
Canton of Dola-Sud

Douya-Onoy (Mouila) 
Commune of Mouila 	 	 	 	
Canton of Dibadi	 	 	 	
Canton of Dikoka	 	 	 
Canton of Ngounié-Centre

Louetsi-Bibaka (Malinga) 
Commune of Malinga	 	 	 
Canton of Haute-Bibaka	 	 	 
Canton of Haute-Louétsi

Louetsi-Wano (Lébamba) 
Commune of Lébamba 	 	 	
Canton of Soungou	 	 	 
Canton of Wanou-Biroundou

Mougalaba (Guiétsou)
Commune of Guiétsou	 	 	
Canton of Basse-Mougalaba	 	 	 
Canton of Haute-Mougalaba

Ndolou (Mandji) 
Commune of Mandji	 	 	
Canton of Doubanga	 	 	 
Canton of Dourembou	 	 	 
Canton of Koumou	 	 	 	
Canton of Péni

Ogoulou (Mimongo) 
Commune of Mimongo	 	 	 	
Canton of Dibwa	 	 	 	
Canton of Haute-Dikobi	 	 	 
Canton of Haute-Ogoulou	 	 	 	
Canton of Ogoulou-Onoye	 	 	 
Canton of Omba	 	 	 
Canton of Vieux-Mimongo

Tsamba-Magotsi (Fougamou) 
Commune of Fougamou	 	 	
Canton of Banda 	 	 	
Canton of Dibwa 	 	 	
Canton of Oumba	 	 	 	
Canton of Sindara	 	 	 	
Canton of Tandou

Nyanga Province

Basse-Banio (Mayumba) 
Commune of Mayumba	 	 	 	
Canton of Loubetsi-Divoungou	 	 
Canton of Mayombé	 	 	
Canton of Mouwambi

Douigni (Moabi) 
Commune of Moabi	 	 	 	
Canton Douami-Mouembi	 	 	 
Canton Doubandji	 	 	 
Canton Migamba-Yara

Doutsila (Mabanda)	 
Commune of Mabanda	 	 
Canton of Haute-Dola	 	 	
Canton of Haute-Ngongo

Haute-Banio (Ndindi) 
Commune of Ndindi	 	 
Canton of Lagune	 	 	
Canton of Louzibi

Mongo (Moulèngui-Binza)	 	
Commune of Moulèngui-Binza	 	 	 
Canton of Douki	 	 	 	
Canton of Voungou

Mougoutsi (Tchibanga) 
Commune of Tchibanga	 	 
Canton of Doughegny	 	 	 	
Canton of Doussegoussou	 	 	 	
Canton of Mougalaba-Divoungou

Ogooué-Ivindo Province

Ivindo (Makokou) 
Commune of Makokou	 	 	 
Canton of Aboye	 	 	 	
Canton of Ivindo	 	 	 	
Canton of Liboumba	 	 	 
Canton of Mouniandzi	 	 	 
Canton of Ntang-Louli

Lope (Booue) 
Commune of Booué	 	 
Canton of Fieng-Okano	 	 	 
Canton of Lélédi	 	 	 	
Canton of Lézinda	 	 	 	
Canton of Nké	 	 	
Canton of Offoue-Aval

Mvoung (Ovan) 
Commune of Ovan	 	
Canton of Belémé	 	 	 
Canton of Dzoué

Zadie (Mekambo) 
Commune of Mékambo	 	 	 
Canton of Bengoué	 	 	 	
Canton of Djouah	 	 	 	
Canton of Loué	 	 	 
Canton of Sassamongo

Ogooué-Lolo Province

Lolo-Bouenguidi (Koulamoutou) 
Commune of Koulamoutou	 	 	 	
Canton of Basse-Lombo	 	 	 	
Canton of Bouénguidi-Moualo	 	 	 
Canton of Lolo-Wagna	 	 	
Canton of Moualo-Onoye

Lombo-Bouenguidi (Pana) 
Commune of Pana	 	 	 
Canton of Haute-Bouénguidi	 	 
Canton of Haute-Lombo

Mouloundou (Lastoursville) 
Commune of Lastoursville	 	 	
Canton of Lassio-Sébé	 	 	 	
Canton of Léyou	 	 	 
Canton of Ogooué-Amont	 	 	 
Canton of Ogooué-Aval	 	 	 	
Canton of Poungui

Offoué-Onoye (Iboundji)	 	
Commune of Iboundji	 	
Canton of Offoué	 	 	
Canton of Onoye

Ogooué-Maritime Province

Bendje (Port-Gentil) 
Commune of Port-Gentil	 	 	 	
Canton of Lac Anengué	 	 	
Canton of Océan	 	 	
Canton of Ogooué

Etimboue (Omboue) 
Commune of Omboué	 	 	 	
Canton of Lagune-Ngooué	 	 	 
Canton of Lagune-Nkomi 	 	 	 	
Canton of Rembo-Nkomi

Ndougou (Gamba) 
Commune of Gamba	 	 	
Canton of Basse-Nyanga	 	 	 	
Canton of Lagune-Ndougou	 	 	 
Canton of Rembo-Bongou

Woleu-Ntem Province

Haut-Komo (Medouneu) 
Commune of Médouneu	 	 	 	
Canton of Komo-Abanga	 	 	
Canton of Mbéy

Haut-Ntem (Minvoul) 
Commune of Minvoul	 	 	 
Canton of Nord	 	 	 
Canton of Sossolo-Ntem	 	 	 	
Canton of Sud

Ntem (Bitam) 
Commune of Bitam	 	 	 	
Canton of Ekorété	 	 	 	
Canton of Kess	 	 	 	
Canton of Koum	 	 	 
Canton of Mboa'a	 	 	 
Canton of Mvézé	 	 	 	
Canton of Ntem I	 	 	 	
Canton of Ntem II

Okano (Mitzic) 
Commune of Mitzic	 	
Canton of Doum	 	 	
Canton of Doumandzou	 
Canton of Lalara	 	 	 	
Canton of Okala

Woleu (Oyem) 
Commune of Oyem	 	 	 	
Canton of Bissok	 	 	 	
Canton of Ellelem	 	 	 	
Canton of Kyé	 	 	 	
Canton of Nyè	 	 
Canton of Woleu

References

External links
Population data

Subdivisions of Gabon
Gabon, Departments
Gabon 3
Gabon geography-related lists